Hot Country Songs is a chart that ranks the top-performing country music songs in the United States, published by Billboard magazine.  In 1963, 10 different singles topped the chart, at the time published under the title Hot Country Singles, although there were 21 distinct runs at the top, as the majority of the singles had multiple spells at number one.  Chart placings were based on playlists submitted by country music radio stations and sales reports submitted by stores.

In the issue of Billboard dated January 5, Marty Robbins climbed to number one with "Ruby Ann", replacing "Don't Let Me Cross Over" by Carl Butler and Pearl, which had been in the top spot in the last issue of 1962.  Robbins only held the number one position for a single week before the husband-and-wife duo returned to the top of the chart.  "Don't Let Me Cross Over" had three separate runs at number one during the early part of the year, the last of which lasted for eight weeks, but it would be the only chart-topper of the duo's career.  Separating the song's three runs in the top spot during the spring of 1963 were two spells at number one for "The Ballad of Jed Clampett" by Lester Flatt and Earl Scruggs, the first song in the bluegrass genre to top the chart.  The song, the theme from television sitcom "The Beverly Hillbillies", was the only number one for the duo.  In May, "Lonesome 7-7203" by Hawkshaw Hawkins topped the chart, his first and only single to reach number one.  This was a posthumous success for the singer, who had died in a plane crash two months earlier.  Later in the year, both George Hamilton IV and Ernest Ashworth achieved their first Hot Country number ones.

Another act to top the chart for the first time in 1963 was Buck Owens, who achieved a number of chart feats during the year.  He spent more weeks at number one in 1963 than any other act, occupying the top spot for a cumulative total of sixteen weeks with "Act Naturally" and "Love's Gonna Live Here".  The latter song was number one for the final eleven weeks of the year, the longest unbroken run at the top of the chart during 1963.  The song remained at number one for a further five weeks in 1964 for a final total of sixteen consecutive weeks in the top spot.  This set a new record for the longest unbroken run at number one on the Hot Country chart which would last for nearly 50 years, when Florida Georgia Line spent a seventeenth consecutive week atop the chart with "Cruise" in 2013.  Owens was also the only act to take more than one single to number one in 1963; he went on to become one of the most successful recording artists of the mid-1960s, achieving 15 country number ones in a five-year period.

Chart history

See also
Billboard Top Country Singles of 1963
1963 in music
1963 in country music
List of artists who reached number one on the U.S. country chart

References

1963
Country
1963 record charts